Boris Petrovich Gerasimovich (–  June 1937) was a Russian and Soviet astronomer and astrophysicist.

Biography
Gerasimovich was born in Kremenchuk (now in Poltava Oblast, Ukraine).  He graduated from Kharkiv University in 1914 having studied under Aristarkh Belopolsky.   From 1917 until 1933 he worked at the Kharkiv University observatory. He became the director of the Pulkovo Observatory in 1933, but was arrested and executed during the Great Purge. He had a daughter, Tatiana Borisovna Gerasimovich.

The crater Gerasimovich on the Moon is named in his honor. A minor planet 2126 Gerasimovich discovered in 1970 by Soviet astronomer Tamara Mikhailovna Smirnova is also named after him.

References

External links
 Letter from Military Prosecutor to T. B. Gerasimovich

1889 births
1937 deaths
People from Kremenchuk
Ukrainian astronomers
Soviet astronomers
Great Purge victims from Russia
Russian people executed by the Soviet Union
National University of Kharkiv alumni
Academic staff of Kharkiv Observatory